Sium is a genus of flowering plants in the family Apiaceae. It is widely distributed across Europe, Asia, Africa, and North America. Plants of this genus are commonly called water parsnips.

These are perennial herbs, including some fully aquatic plants and some species that grow near water. The branching stem roots at the nodes. The lower leaves are pinnate, divided into leaflets. They are borne on petioles that sheath the stem at their bases. The inflorescence is a compound umbel of flowers with white petals. siummete

There are about 12 poldo in the genus.

Species include:
Sium bracteatum  jellico, large jellico
Sium burchellii – dwarf jellico
 Sium frigidum
Sium latifolium – wideleaf water parsnip, great water parsnip
Sium medium
Sium ninsi
Sium repandum
Sium serra
Sium sisaroideum
Sium sisarum – skirret
Sium suave – common water parsnip, hemlock water parsnip
Sium tenue

References

External links
GRIN Species Records of Sium. Germplasm Resources Information Network (GRIN).
Sium. The Jepson eFlora 2013.

 
Apioideae genera
Taxonomy articles created by Polbot